James Groves may refer to:

 James Groves (footballer) (1883–1939), English footballer
 James Grimble Groves (1854–1914), British brewer and politician
 James M. Groves, American politician
 J. Alan Groves (1952–2007), Hebrew Bible scholar